James Hodson Anderson (August 4, 1909 – 1996) was an American politician and lawyer. He was elected Nebraska Attorney General in 1948. He resigned the position in March 1950.

Work as Counsel for the Union Pacific Railroad Company and Selected Cases

After his time as the Attorney General of Nebraska, he became an important counsel for the Union Pacific Railroad Company. In this capacity he represented the Union Pacific in many legal cases before courts such as the U.S. District Court for the Southern District of Iowa  and the US Court of Appeals for the Seventh Circuit among others. 

As a counsel for the Union Pacific, he was called on to represent the company before the United States Supreme Court as well. In one such case, United States v. Union Pacific R. Co. - argued from January 23, 1957 and decided on April 8, 1957 - he had on his legal team, Warren M. Christopher, who would later serve as US Secretary of State. Representing the United States as opposing counsel was US Solicitor General, James Lee Rankin, along with a team of lawyers that assisted him. Six years later James Rankin would be appointed General Counsel on the Warren Commission.

References

1909 births
1996 deaths
Nebraska Attorneys General
Nebraska Republicans
Place of birth missing
Place of death missing
Date of death missing
20th-century American politicians